Kharar may refer to:

 Kharar, Ghatal, a town in West Bengal
 Kharar, SAS Nagar, a municipal council in Sahibzada Ajit Singh Nagar district, Punjab, India
 Kharar Assembly Constituency